Paulo de Oliveira Leite Setúbal (January 1, 1893 – May 4, 1937) was a Brazilian writer, lawyer, journalist, essayist and poet.

He occupied the 31st chair of the Brazilian Academy of Letters from 1934 until his death in 1937.

1893 births
1937 deaths
Brazilian male poets
Brazilian journalists
20th-century Brazilian lawyers
People from Tatuí
Members of the Brazilian Academy of Letters
20th-century Brazilian poets
20th-century Brazilian male writers
20th-century journalists